Maoyi Town is an urban town in Lengshuijiang, Loudi City, Hunan Province, People's Republic of China.

Administrative division
The town is divided into 8 villages and 2 communities, the following areas: Changpu Community, Gangxi Community, Xiaoheng Village, Gangxi Village, Dazhou Village, Huaping Village, Maoyi Village, Qingtang Village, Qingyi Village, and Qunfeng Village (长铺社区、筻溪社区、小横村、筻溪村、大洲村、花坪村、毛易村、清塘村、清一村、群丰村).

Historic township-level divisions of Lengshuijiang